Changzhou International School was a key provincial school in the Xinbei district of Changzhou, Jiangsu, People's Republic of China. It had around 1,000 enrolled students from China and abroad.

History
Changzhou International School was founded in 1997 as a pilot middle school by the Changzhou Xin Bei government and the Changzhou education bureau. The school was founded with a 190,000,000 RMB initial investment.

Geography
The school sat on 12.6 hectares in Changzhou's Xin Bei district, approximately 10 km north of Changzhou city centre.

External links 

Official website

International schools in China
Buildings and structures in Changzhou
Educational institutions established in 1997
1997 establishments in China